David "Dolly" Christy (3 July 1869 –  2 July 1919) was an Australian rules footballer in the West Australian Football League (WAFL).

Christy was a highly successful ruckman and centre half-forward who was one of the founders of football in Western Australia. He began his career with Ballarat, who resigned from the VFA in 1888; after two years of local premiership matches, he crossed to Melbourne in the VFA, playing there from 1891 until 1896.

He became a driving force in establishing football in Western Australia, playing sixteen of his twenty-six seasons there. He played with Fremantle and with Imperials, and upon the latter club's dissolution, was a co-founder of the East Fremantle Football Club in 1898.

Christy retired midway through the 1912 season, a week before his 43rd birthday, and his career total of 345 games remained an elite Australian rules football record until it was broken by Graham "Polly" Farmer in Round 11 of the 1971 WANFL season. Christy also played 20 interstate football matches for Victoria and Western Australia; if these are included, then he played a total of 365 senior career games, which remained an elite Australian rules football record until it was broken by Farmer in Round 17 of 1970.

Christy's 26 career seasons and ten career premierships (equal with Alfred "Topsy" Waldron) are both records for elite Australian rules football as of 2022; given the nature of the modern game, these records are highly unlikely to ever be broken.

In 1996, Christy was inducted into the Australian Football Hall of Fame, and in 2004 he was inducted to the WA Football Hall of Fame.

References

External links 

David Christy on Demonwiki

1870 births
1919 deaths
Australian rules footballers from Ballarat
East Fremantle Football Club players
Fremantle Football Club (1881–1899) players
Ballarat Football Club players
Australian Football Hall of Fame inductees
Imperials Football Club players
West Australian Football Hall of Fame inductees
Melbourne Football Club (VFA) players